Tipulodes is a genus of moths in the subfamily Arctiinae, which currently contains 3 species. The genus was described by Boisduval in 1832.
The genus is described as "Small Arctiids with relatively narrow wings. Ground colour brownish black with characteristic wings patterns. Forewing with elongate rusty-red blotch from the base almost to the apex, hindwing with rusty-red stripe along the costal edge; underside of wings similarly coloured. Males with coremata forming membranous tubes, much longer than abdomen when everted, covered with hairs along the whole length"

Species
 Tipulodes ima Boisduval, 1832
 Tipulodes rubriceps Dognin, 1912
 Tipulodes annae Przybyłowicz, 2003

References

Natural History Museum Lepidoptera generic names catalog

Arctiinae